Pakistan competed at the 1984 Summer Olympics in Los Angeles, United States.  The nation returned to the Games after participating in the American-led boycott of the 1980 Summer Olympics. Pakistan won the gold medal in the men's hockey team competition.

Medalists

Results by event

Athletics

Men's 100 metres

 Mohammad Mansha
 Heat 6 round 1; 10.87 (→ did not advance)

Men's 200 metres

 Mohammad Mansha
 Heat 3 round 1; 22.04 (→ did not advance)

Men's 400 metres

 Syed Meesaq Rizvi
 Heat 3 round 1; 49.58 (→ did not advance)

Men's 800 metres

 Syed Meesaq Rizvi
 Heat 6 round 1; 1:51.29 (→ did not advance)

Men's javelin throw

 Mohammad Rasheed
 Qualifying Group 2; 74.58m (→ did not advance, overall 21st place)

Boxing

Men's bantamweight (54 kg)

 Babar Ali Khan
 1/32 round; Bye
 1/16 round; Defeated Firmin Abissi (BEN) on pts 5:0
 1/8 round; Lost to Robinsón Pitalúa (COL) on pts 5:0

Men's lightweight (60 kg)

 Asif Dar
 1/32 round; Defeated Shlomo Niazov (ISR) on pts 5:0
 1/16 round; Lost to Leopoldo Cantancio (PHI) on pts 5:0

Men's welterweight (67 kg)

 Syed Abrar Hussain
 1/32 round; Bye
 1/16 round; Lost to Vesa Koskela (SWE) on pts 4:1

Men's super heavyweight (+91 kg)

 Mohammad Yousuf
 1/8 round; Lost to Lennox Lewis (CAN) RSC rd 3

Hockey

Men's Team Competition

Preliminary round Pool B
 Defeated  (3-0)
 Defeated  (7-1)

Semifinals
 Defeated  (1-0)

Final
 Defeated  (2-1, after extra time)

Pakistan won the gold medal

Team Roster
 Manzoor Hussain (captain)
 Hanif Khan (vice-captain)
 Syed Ghulam Moinuddin (gk)
 Shahid Ali Khan (gk) 
 Mushtaq Ahmad
 Ishtiaq Ahmed
 Naeem Akhtar
 Nasir Ali
 Tauqeer Dar
 Khalid Hameed
 Kalimullah
 Ayaz Mahmood
 Abdul Rashid Al-Hasan
 Hasan Sardar
 Qasim Zia
 Saleem Sherwani

Forward Saleem Sherwani is not the same player as his namesake, Saleem Sherwani (field hockey goalkeeper) who was the Pakistan goalkeeper at the Munich Olympics in 1972 and in the Montreal Olympiad in 1976.

Wrestling Freestyle

Men's 74 kg Group A

 Muhammad Gul
 Round 1; Lost to Ali Faris (IRQ) by fall
 Round 2; Bye
 Round 3; Lost to Myung-Woo Han (KOR) by fall

Men's 90 kg Group A

 Abdul Majeed Maruwala
 Round 1; Beat Ilie Matei (ROM) on pts 12:0
 Round 2; Beat Edwin Lins (AUT) on pts 11:6
 Round 3; Lost to Ismail Temiz (TUR) on pts. Match drawn 3:3 but Temiz won the judges verdict
 Round 4; Lost to Ed Banach (USA) by fall

Yachting

Soling Class

 Khalid Mahmood Akhtar, Adnan Yousuf and Naseem Anwar Khan
 Points 172.00 Net points 145.00 after seven races. Finished 20th out of 22

Finn Class

 Arshad Choudhry
 Points 198.00 Net points 168.00 after seven races. Finished 24th out of 28

470 Class

 Munir Sadiq and Mohammad Zakaullah
 Points 182.00 Net points 147.00 after seven races. Finished 22nd out of 28

References
Official Olympic Reports
International Olympic Committee results database

Nations at the 1984 Summer Olympics
1984
1984 in Pakistani sport